A number of steamships have been named Condor, including two Grace Line ships

, captured and sunk by Germany in 1914
, in service 1927–1940

See also

Ship names